Museumsufer (Museum Embankment) is the name of a landscape of museums in Frankfurt, Hesse, Germany, lined up on both banks of the river Main or in close vicinity. The centre is the historic art museum Städel. The other museums were added, partly by transforming historic villas, partly by building new museums, in the 1980s by cultural politician Hilmar Hoffmann. The exhibition hall Portikus was opened on an island at the Alte Brücke in 2006.

, 39 museums belong to the Museumsufer.

History 
The idea for a group of different museums in Frankfurt was proposed in 1977 by Hilmar Hoffmann, who was then as  Kulturdezernent responsible for culture in the city. Before, architect  had proposed a concept  to the forum for development (Frankfurter Forum für Stadtentwicklung). Between 1980 and 1990, existing museums were expanded and many new ones built, often including historic villas. Architects included internationally known Richard Meier, Oswald Mathias Ungers, Josef Paul Kleihues, Günter Behnisch and Hans Hollein.

Beginning in 2008, Frankfurt has restored and expanded some of its museums. The Städel was expanded by an annex, and the Film Museum was renovated.

South bank 
 , (Hindemith Kabinett)
 , housing one of the largest collections of Russian, Bulgarian, Greek and other icons in Germany
 Museum Angewandte Kunst (Museum Applied Arts), housing furniture and design from the 10th to 21st century with a notable collection of East Asian applied arts
 Museum der Weltkulturen (Ethnological Museum), displaying a small part of an ethnological collection in changing exhibitions.
  (German Film Museum), explaining the development of movie-making from the beginnings in the 19th century up until today, includes an art house cinema
 German Architecture Museum (Deutsches Architekturmuseum), apart from a small permanent collection, changing exhibitions showcase current architectural projects and trends from around the globe.
 Museum für Kommunikation (Communication Museum). The large permanent collection displays various relics from the postal and telephone services, including one of the world's largest stamp collections and a collection of communication related art; temporary exhibitions focus more on the abstract phenomenon of communication.
 Städel, one of Germany's prominent fine art museums with a focus on old masters and classical modern art
 Liebieghaus, a sculpture collection, focusing mainly on sculpture from ancient Greece until the renaissance days
 Museum Giersch, showcasing a small permanent collection of local 19th-century artists and houses temporary exhibition on artists that have a (loose) connection to the Frankfurt region
 Portikus, a small free exhibition space showing temporary exhibitions of contemporary art
 Eintracht Frankfurt Museum (Waldstadion)

Museums located in Offenbach am Main:
 German Leather Museum
 Klingspor Museum, book and letter art

Gallery South bank

North bank 
 Jewish Museum Frankfurt. The permanent collection gives an overview of the varied fate of Frankfurt's Jewish community through the centuries. Temporary exhibitions focus on contemporary Jewish life and art.
 Historical Museum, displaying artefacts off the city's history from Roman times until today, some very prominent old master paintings and sculptures and various temporary exhibitions
 Caricatura Museum, comic art

Museums located in the Old Town but not right on the river bank:
 Schirn
 Museum für Moderne Kunst
 Part of the Jewish museum in the Frankfurter Judengasse
  in the 
 Deutsches Romantik-Museum / Goethe House

Museums located in Westend, Frankfurt:
 Naturmuseum Senckenberg

Gallery North bank

Events 
The street on the south is called Schaumainkai and is often partially closed to traffic for Frankfurt's largest flea market each Saturday.

Tickets
 MuseumsuferTicket (2 days)
 MuseumsuferCard (1 year)

Panorama

See also
 Schaumainkai
 Sachsenhausen (Frankfurt am Main)
 Altstadt (Frankfurt am Main)

References

Further reading

External links 
 

Geography of Frankfurt
Museumsufer
Museum districts
Lists of museums
Tourist attractions in Frankfurt